Antonia Locatelli (16 November 1937 – 10 March 1992) was an Italian Roman Catholic missionary educator who had lived in Rwanda since the early 1970s.

In March 1992, she witnessed massacres of the Tutsis taking place in the Bugesera region, south of Kigali. In an attempt to save 300 to 400 Tutsis, she phoned the Belgian embassy, French RFI Radio and the BBC.

On the night between 9 and 10 March 1992, she was gunned down by a group of presidential guards who had arrived from Kigali.

Her murder was announcend on RFI the next morning:

Antonia Locatelli is buried in Nyamata, near the church in which, during the Rwandan genocide two years later, ten thousand Tutsis were massacred.

During the commemoration ceremony marking the 25th anniversary of the Rwandan genocide (Kigali, April 7, 2019), Paul Kagame paid tribute to Antonia in his opening speech:

References

Books
 P. Costa–L. Scalettari, La lista del console, published by Paoline, Milan, 2004, page 43.
 André Sibomana, J’accuse per il Rwanda, published by Gruppo Abele, Turin, 1998, pages 65 and 117.

External links
 Antonia Locatelli: Biography - Comune di Padova (Italian) (Google translation)
 Antonia Locatelli on Gardens of the Righteous Worldwide - Gariwo 
 Ruanda, suora italiana uccisa mentre difendeva i suoi alunni (Italian nun killed while defending her pupils) - La Repubblica (1992) (Italian) (Google translation)

1937 births
1992 deaths
Italian humanitarians
Women humanitarians
Italian expatriates in Rwanda
Roman Catholic missionaries in Rwanda
Missionary educators
People murdered in Rwanda
Italian people murdered abroad
Deaths by firearm in Rwanda
1990s murders in Rwanda
1992 crimes in Rwanda
1992 murders in Africa